The 2014–15 South Dakota State Jackrabbits men's basketball team represented South Dakota State University during the 2014–15 NCAA Division I men's basketball season. The Jackrabbits, led by 20th year head coach Scott Nagy, played their home games at Frost Arena and were members of the Summit League. They finished the season 24–11, 12–4 in The Summit League play to finish in a share for The Summit League regular season championship. They advanced to the championship game of The Summit League tournament where they lost to North Dakota State. As a regular season champion, and #1 seed in their league tournament, who failed to win their league tournament, they received an automatic bid to the National Invitation Tournament where they defeated Colorado State in the first round before losing in the second round to Vanderbilt.

Roster

Schedule

|-
!colspan=9 style="background:#003896; color:#F7D417;"| Exhibition

|-
!colspan=9 style="background:#003896; color:#F7D417;"| Regular season

|-
!colspan=9 style="background:#003896; color:#F7D417;"| The Summit League tournament

|-
!colspan=9 style="background:#003896; color:#F7D417;"| NIT

Source:

References

South Dakota State Jackrabbits men's basketball seasons
South Dakota State
South Dakota State
2014 in sports in South Dakota
2015 in sports in South Dakota